10+2 is a children's animated series from Catalonia (Spain), produced by Accio Studios and Victory Media Group, and directed by Miquel Pujol i Lozano. The show debuted in 1991.

Summary
The series takes place in the fictional country of Numberland, centered in a school taught by the teacher Aristotle and his assistant Infinite. The students consist of ten living numbers from zero till nine, each with differing personalities. The characters are mute and only communicate in vocal noises and body language. Throughout the episodes, every night Aristotle would narrate the day's events in flashback, with moments of counting quantities corresponding to the number characters. However, in the movies all characters have full speech.

Characters

Series characters
Professor Aristotle - The teacher of Numberland. Quite firm and serious.
Infinite - Aristotle's assistant. Called Monty in the English dub. Very helpful towards others.
Cuco - A yellow cuckoo bird who lives in the classroom clock.
Zero - A mischievous and disobedient sort.
One - A forgetful sort who likes to keep up appearances.
Two - Has a love for water and sailing.
Three - A cross and grumpy sort.
Four - A lazy sort who loves to doze off.
Five - Prone to misfortune and runs into trouble often.
Six - A neat and tidy busybody who does gardening.
Seven - An athletic and active sort.
Eight - A greedy sort who loves eating cakes and sweets.
Nine - An experimental and scientific sort.

Movies Characters
Milesima - Aristotle's and Elenica's niece. Very playful, carefree and fancies herself as a pirate.
Miss Zenobia - The substitute teacher. A very bossy, mean sort, far more strict than Aristotle.
Mr. Postman - A white pigeon with pilot goggles, who grudgingly delivers the letters and occasionally does rescuing when needed.
Doctor - An owl who wears a green suit and gives medical advice.

Episodes

Season 1 (1991–92)

Season 2 (1998)

Season 3 (2003–04)

Movies

The Magical Night
In 2000, Miquel Pujol created a 45-minute Christmas Special movie title "10+2: La Noche Mágica", where Infinite goes on a winter adventure after an embarrassing moment during Christmas preparations.

The Great Secret
In 2001, Miquel Pujol created an 85-minute movie titled "10+2: El Gran Secreto" starring Milesima and the new teacher Zenobia. It was nominated in the fifteenth edition of the Goya Awards in the category of best animated film.

Letters and Pirates
In 2005, a 47-minute movie was made titled "10+2: Cartes i Pirates", where Milesima as Captain Red Braid takes Infinite and the ten numbers on pirate voyage to find the treasure trove of Rocky Head Island.

References

External links
 Accio

10+2: El Gran Secretoe Production

1994 Spanish television series debuts
2013 Spanish television series endings
Catalan television programmes
Spanish children's animated comedy television series
Animated television series about mice and rats
1990s Spanish television series
2000s Spanish television series
2010s Spanish television series
Animated preschool education television series
1990s preschool education television series
2000s preschool education television series
2010s preschool education television series